The 2017 Texas Longhorns baseball team represented the University of Texas at Austin during the 2017 NCAA Division I baseball season. The Longhorns played their home games at UFCU Disch–Falk Field as a member of the Big 12 Conference. They were led by head coach David Pierce, in his first season at Texas.

The Longhorns finished as the runner-up for the 2017 Big 12 Conference baseball tournament, then finished as runner-up to Long Beach State in the Long Beach Regional.

Personnel

Roster

Coaches

Schedule and Results

All rankings from Collegiate Baseball.

Rankings

References

Texas Longhorns
2018
Texas Longhorns baseball
2017 NCAA Division I baseball tournament participants